The 1984 Railway Cup Hurling Championship was the 58th staging of the Railway Cup since its establishment by the Gaelic Athletic Association in 1927. The cup began on 17 March 1984 and ended on 18 March 1984.

Connacht were the defending champions, however, they were beaten by Leinster in the semi-final.

On 18 March 1984, Munster won the cup after a 1-18 to 2-09 defeat of Leinster in the final at Cusack Park. This was their 36th Railway Cup title overall and their first title since 1981.

Results

Semi-finals

Final

Scoring statistics

Top scorers overall

Bibliography

 Donegan, Des, The Complete Handbook of Gaelic Games (DBA Publications Limited, 2005).

References

Railway Cup Hurling Championship
Railway Cup Hurling Championship
Hurling